Joseph I. Pines (1922-2009) was an American lawyer and Judge on the Supreme Bench of Baltimore City  (later renamed the Circuit Court for Baltimore).

Background
Pines, the son of a grocer, was born Joseph I. Pinas in New York City. In 1925, his father moved the family to Baltimore where they settled on East Biddle Street. His father established a grocery store on Orleans Street and later moved to Liberty Heights Avenue in Northwest Baltimore, when he opened a store. Pines was a 1939 graduate of Baltimore City College. He earned his law degree from the University of Baltimore in 1942, 5 years later he changed his name to Joseph I Pines. Pines was admitted to
Maryland Bar in 1943 and was a  member, American, Maryland State
and Baltimore City Bar Associations. He was also a member of the American
Trial Lawyers Association.

Judicial career
Pines was appointed to Supreme Bench of Baltimore City, January 28, 1980 and retired from the Baltimore City Circuit Court, February 19, 1992. He continued to hear cases as a visiting judge through 2001. Pines is described as having a very even-tempered demeanor and was always very fair by Judge Joseph H. H. Kaplan who also said of Pines "I was the administrative judge for a lot of the years he was on the bench, and I never heard one complaint about his mistreating someone." In June 1986, a Baltimore jury convicted Flint Gregory Hunt of first degree murder, and he was sentenced to death by Judge Pines the following month.  Pines was a member of the Maryland Judicial Conference and part of the Conference's executive committee.

Death
On April 16, 2009, Judge Pines died at the age of 87, just four days after his wife Marcia died. Interment was at the Beth Tfiloh Cemetery.

References

Maryland lawyers
Lawyers from Baltimore
1922 births
2009 deaths
Maryland state court judges
20th-century American judges
20th-century American lawyers